Ufimsky (Öfö) is a rural locality (a selo) and the administrative centre of Ufimsky Selsoviet, Khaybullinsky District, Bashkortostan, Russia. The population was 1,329 as of 2010. There are 14 streets.

Geography 
Ufimsky is located 44 km north of Akyar (the district's administrative centre) by road. Alibayevskoye is the nearest rural locality.

References 

Rural localities in Khaybullinsky District